Conquering the Fear of Flight is Wavorly's first album, which was released June 12, 2007 nationwide in the United States. The album has received significant attention from Christian press outlets. Two singles, "Madmen" and "Part One", have both reached No. 1 on Christian rock radio stations. "Praise and Adore (Some Live Without It)" and "Forgive and Forget" were also released as radio singles in 2007 and 2008.

Track listing

References 

2007 albums
Flicker Records albums